Interstate 675 (I-675) is an auxiliary Interstate Highway in the suburbs of Dayton in the US state of Ohio. As originally proposed, the route was to reconnect with I-75 north of Dayton near Northridge rather than going east toward Springfield and I-70 (this was later rejected because part of the right-of-way would have gone through Wright-Patterson Air Force Base). Construction was completed in 1987, though some have lobbied to extend the highway west of Dayton.

Route description

From the south, the highway begins at a semi-directional T interchange with I-75 in Miami Township, with four lanes.

Next, there is a modified split diamond interchange with State Route 725 (SR 725) in Washington Township; ramps to and from the south connect to SR 725, with an additional directional loop ramp from eastbound SR 725 to northbound I-675; ramps to and from the north connect to Yankee Street. Rather than employing a pair of one-way frontage roads typical for this type of interchange, access between SR 725 and Yankee Street is made via Leona Lane or via Yankee Street itself (both two-way streets). After this interchange, the highway opens to six lanes.

The next junction is with SR 48 on the border of unincorporated Washington Township and the city of Centerville. First, there is a half-diamond interchange at West Alexandersville–Bellbrook (Alex–Bell) Road, providing a northbound exit and a southbound entrance. Next, there is a four-ramp partial cloverleaf interchange with SR 48. The loop ramp from northbound I-675 to SR 48 is directional northbound, and there is a directional ramp from southbound SR 48 to southbound I-675; thus, the movements from northbound I-675 to southbound SR 48, and from northbound SR 48 to southbound I-675, are made via Alex–Bell Road.

The next major junction is with US Route 35 (US 35) in Beavercreek, which is a full-access combination interchange; southbound traffic at this interchange uses collector–distributor lanes.

The junction with North Fairfield Road and SR 844 provides access to Wright-Patterson Air Force Base Area A, Wright State University, and the Nutter Center. The configuration is a hybrid diamond interchange, with complete access provided to North Fairfield Road. There is partial direct access provided to SR 844: the exit ramp from northbound I-675 splits, with the right branch meeting North Fairfield Road, while the left branch becomes northbound SR 844 and flies under both I-675 and North Fairfield Road; the entrance ramp from North Fairfield Road to southbound I-675 is offset from its expected position in a diamond interchange, allowing southbound SR 844 to fly under North Fairfield Road and to merge on the entrance ramp's left. Access from southbound I-675 to northbound SR 844, and from southbound SR 844 to northbound I-675, is made indirectly, via North Fairfield Road and Colonel Glenn Highway. The Interstate reduces to four lanes just after this interchange.

The highway has a cloverleaf interchange with I-70 near Fairborn, where it ends. The road continues as two-lane Spangler Road, which leads to the unincorporated community of Medway.

History

By 1985, the road had been completed to the interchange with SR 844.

Exit list

References

External links

Kurumi - I-675 Ohio

75-6 Ohio
75-6
6 Ohio
Transportation in Montgomery County, Ohio
Transportation in Greene County, Ohio
Transportation in Clark County, Ohio
1987 establishments in Ohio